Ernests Gulbis won the last edition of the tournament held in 2013, but lost in the first round to Marcos Baghdatis.
Milos Raonic won the title, defeating João Sousa in the final, 6–3, 3–6, 6–3.

Seeds
The top four seeds receive a bye into the second round.

Draw

Finals

Top half

Bottom half

Qualifying

Seeds

Qualifiers

Qualifying draw

First qualifier

Second qualifier

Third qualifier

Fourth qualifier

References
 Main draw
 Qualifying draw

2015 Singles
2015 ATP World Tour
2015 in Russian sport